Polycera atra, common name orange-spike polycera or sorcerer's sea slug, is a species of sea slug, a nudibranch, a marine gastropod mollusk in the family Polyceridae.

Distribution
This species of polycerid nudibranch was described from California.

Description
The body of Polycera atra is translucent white with longitudinal black lines interspersed with rows of raised yellow spots. The oral veil has 4-8 tapering yellow-tipped papillae.

Ecology
Polycera atra feeds on the bryozoan Bugula.

References

Polyceridae
Gastropods described in 1905